The women's 5000 metres walk event at the 1994 World Junior Championships in Athletics was held in Lisbon, Portugal, at Estádio Universitário de Lisboa on 23 July.

Medalists

Results

Final
23 July

Participation
According to an unofficial count, 28 athletes from 20 countries participated in the event.

References

5000 metres walk
Racewalking at the World Athletics U20 Championships